George McGovern unsuccessfully ran for president twice:

 George McGovern presidential campaign, 1968, the failed campaign George McGovern conducted in 1968
 George McGovern presidential campaign, 1972